Bua Lai is a district (amphoe) in the northeastern part of Nakhon Ratchasima province, northeastern Thailand.

History
The area of Bua Lai was separated from Bua Yai district and made a minor district (king amphoe) on 1 July 1997. Most of the people of Bua Lai originally migrated there from Maha Sarakham and Roi Et provinces.

On 15 May 2007, all of Thailand's 81 minor districts were upgraded to full districts. With publication in the Royal Gazette on 24 August the upgrade became official.

Geography
Neighboring districts are (from the north clockwise): Waeng Noi and Phon of Khon Kaen province and Prathai, Sida, and Bua Yai.

Administration
The district is divided into four subdistricts (tambons). The township (thesaban tambon) Nong Bua Lai covers parts of tambon Bua Lai.

References

External links
amphoe.com

Bua Lai